The May 18 Memorial Foundation is a prominent organization based in the city of Gwangju, South Korea, with a view to commemorate and develop the spirit of struggle and solidarity of the Gwangju Uprising, also known as the May 18 Democratic Uprising and May 18 Gwangju Uprising. The organization was founded in 1994 by the May 18 victims, Gwangju citizens, overseas Koreans and Korean nationals, who believe in promoting the May 18 spirit to respect the sacrifice of the victims, strengthen democracy of modern Korea and to stand in solidarity with the democratic struggles in Asia and beyond.

Background 
About the background and context of establishing the foundation, its website page reads: "May means a sacrifice for us rather than an unhealed wound. May is history that is to be remembered not only for the victims of the May 18 Democratization Movement but also for all citizens in Korea. In addition, people need to learn the May Spirit from a realistic perspective in order to spread the Spirit to the world. In this respect, the May 18 Memorial Foundation was established to do various projects related to the May 18 Democratization Movement such as commemorative, scholarship, research, culture, and publication projects."

The organization also helps promote and protect democracy, human rights and peace building regionally and internationally.

Major Achievements

Asian Declarations on Rights to Justice, Peace and Culture 
In May 2018, Asian Declarations on a right to justice, a right to peace and a right to culture were announced in the city of Gwangju by the May 18 Memorial Foundation along with Asian Human Rights Commission. These declarations, also known as the “Gwangju Declarations” were made to commemorate the Gwangju pro-democratic movement of 1980. According to The Korea Herald article written by Praveen Kumar Yadav, international intern at the May 18 Memorial Foundation, "The main objective of bringing about the Gwangju Declarations was to identify the gaps and challenges in addressing human rights violations in Asia, and to suggest effective measures to resolve the problems. The declarations are added to the Asian Human Rights Charter: A People’s Charter 1998."

'Asian Human Rights Charter: A People's Charter 1998
In May 1984, Asian Human Rights Charter: A People's Charter was promulgated in the city of Gwangju with a joint effort of Hong Kong-based Asian Human Rights Commission (AHRC) and the May 18 Memorial Foundation. The Asian charter was inspired from the great struggles for democracy and freedom in Asia, including the struggles of the Gwangju citizens in 1980.

Gwangju Human Rights Prize
The Gwangju Prize for Human Rights is a regular award given by the May 18 Memorial Foundation to recognize "individuals, groups or institutions in Korea and abroad that have contributed in promoting and advancing human rights, democracy and peace through their work." The award is intended to commemorate the spirit of the May 1980 Gwangju Democratization Movement (also known as "518" for its 18 May start), in which pro-democracy citizens battled soldiers in protest of the military reign of Chun Doo-hwan.

This prize, that carries a cash award of USD50,000 has been provided since 2000. Here is the list of the winners of the Gwangju Prize for Human Rights.

Father Nandana Manatunga from Sri Lanka bagged the latest Gwangju Prize for Human Rights for his and team's struggle that has helped secure convictions against perpetrators of rape and torture.

List of Gwangju Prize for Human Rights Laureates

See also 

 Gwangju Uprising
 May 18th National Cemetery
 Gwangju Prize for Human Rights 
Taxi Driver

References 

Gwangju Uprising